Harry Potter and the Deathly Hallows – Part 1 could refer to:

 Harry Potter and the Deathly Hallows – Part 1
 Harry Potter and the Deathly Hallows – Part 1 (video game)
 Harry Potter and the Deathly Hallows – Part 1 (soundtrack)